The Casa dei Cavalieri di Rodi (House of the Knights of Rhodes) is a building in Rome. Sited in the ruins of the Forum of Augustus, it was built by the Knights Hospitaller at the end of the 13th century and since 1946 has been used by their successors, the Sovereign Military Order of Malta.

History

Basilian monastery 

The Forum of Augustus and Temple of Mars Ultor were probably destroyed by earthquakes in the 5th century. In the medieval era it was known by several names - the forum itself as Foro transitorio, Foro di Nerva and Foro di San Basilio, and the temple as Palatium Traiani Imperatoris (palace of emperor Trajan) or the temple of Nerva ('tempio di Nerva'). 'Foro di San Basilio' refers to the first medieval use of the Forum, the small 10th century church of San Basilio al Foro di Augusto and its adjoining Basilian monastery, built on the podium of the temple and its exedra. The walls of that complex were found during the 1930s demolition phase and dated to the 9th-10th centuries.

The Basilian church was a small oratory built into the temple's apse. It was originally intended to be used as a monastery.

Restoration 
The convent was demolished in 1930 and the building was transferred to the Comune di Roma, which restored it between 1940 and 1950 before assigning it to the Order of Malta straight after World War Two.

References

Bibliography 
 Guido Fiorini, La casa dei Cavalieri di Rodi al Foro di Augusto, Libreria dello Stato, 1951

External links 
Page on the Casa on the Sovrintendenza ai BBCC del Comune di Roma

Buildings and structures completed in the 13th century
Knights Hospitaller
Buildings and structures of the Sovereign Military Order of Malta
Buildings and structures in Rome